Boothiella is a genus of fungi within the Chaetomiaceae family. This is a monotypic genus, containing the single species Boothiella tetraspora.

The genus name of Boothiella is in honour of Colin Booth (1924 - 2003), a British botanist (mycology) and plant pathologist. He was Deputy Director of the International Mycological Institute (IMI) in Kew.

References

External links
Boothiella at Index Fungorum

Sordariales
Monotypic Sordariomycetes genera